Chariton Township is an inactive township in Randolph County, in the U.S. state of Missouri.

Chariton Township was erected in 1832.

References

Townships in Missouri
Townships in Randolph County, Missouri